Victoria Constance Mary Longley (24 September 1960 – 29 August 2010) was an Australian actress. She worked extensively in television.

Career
She debuted in a film called The More Things Change as a pregnant au pair. An early foray into television was in the epic miniseries The Dirtwater Dynasty, opposite Hugo Weaving and “Edens Lost” 4 part TV miniseries for ABC in 1989. In the ABC television series, Mercury, not-so-loosely based on the Sunday Age, she played a senior journalist, with Geoffrey Rush cast as editor, believed to be modelled on Bruce Guthrie.

Her television credits included: Murder Call, Wildside, Water Rats, Farscape, The Alien Years, Turtle Beach, Young Lions, and All Saints.
She was the daughter of doctor and rowing coach Eric Longley. Her mother Pamela studied Law as she brought up her four daughters of which Victoria was the youngest. When she was young she lived in Longueville NSW.

Filmography

FILM

TELEVISION

Death
Longley died from breast cancer, aged 49, in St Leonards, New South Wales.

Awards and nominations

References

External links
Obituary – The Sydney Morning Herald

1960 births
2010 deaths
Actresses from Sydney
Australian film actresses
Australian stage actresses
Australian television actresses
Deaths from cancer in New South Wales
Deaths from breast cancer
Best Actress AACTA Award winners
Best Supporting Actress AACTA Award winners